During the 2008–09 season, the Spanish football club :Valencia CF was placed 6th in the :La Liga. The team reached the quarterfinal round of the :Copa del Rey.

Squad

Transfers

In

Out

Loaned out

Statistics

Appearances and goals

Last updated on 24 Jan 2009.

|}

Goal scorers

Disciplinary record

Competitions

Overall

La Liga

League table

Results by round

Matches

UEFA Cup

Overall

Results summary

Results by round

First round

First leg

Second leg

Group stage

Results summary

Matches

Round of 32

First leg

Second leg

Copa del Rey

Overall

Results summary

Results by round

Round of 32

First leg

Second leg

Round of 16

First leg

Second leg

Quarter-final

First leg

Second leg

References 

Valencia CF seasons
Valencia